Eb5 or EB5 may refer to:

 EB-5 visa, an employment visa
 EB-5 Reform and Integrity Act, United States law pertaining to the visa
 2022 EB5, an asteroid